This is a list of Canadian films which were released in 2003:

See also
 2003 in Canada
 2003 in Canadian television

External links
Feature Films Released In 2003 With Country of Origin Canada at IMDb
Canada's Top Ten for 2003 (list of top ten Canadian feature films, selected in a process administered by TIFF)
 List of 2003 box office number-one films in Canada

2003
2003 in Canadian cinema
Canada